Konjin (also Romanize as Konjīn, Kundzhun, and Kunjun) is a village in Kaghazkonan-e Shomali Rural District, Kaghazkonan District, Meyaneh County, East Azerbaijan Province, Iran. At the 2006 census, its population was 105, in 30 families.

References 

Populated places in Meyaneh County